Jim Addis is an American politician and businessman from Idaho. Addis is a Republican member of Idaho House of Representatives for District 4, seat A.

Education 
In 1984, Addis earned a bachelor's degree in business management/economics from Washington State University.

Career 
In 1998, Addis became a general manager of Tom Addis Auto Group, until 2016.

In 2017, Addis became the owner of Lake City Wholesale, LLC, a company in the auto industry.

On November 6, 2018, Addis won the election and became a Republican member of Idaho House of Representatives for District 4, seat A. Addis defeated Rebecca Schroeder with 56.7% of the votes.

Personal life 
Addis' wife is Terri Addis. They have one child. Addis and his family live in Coeur d'Alene, Idaho.

References

External links 
 Jim Addis at ballotpedia.org

Living people
21st-century American politicians
Republican Party members of the Idaho House of Representatives
Washington State University alumni
Year of birth missing (living people)
People from Coeur d'Alene, Idaho